This is a list of films produced in the early People's Republic of China ordered by year of release in the 1950s. For an alphabetical listing of Chinese films see :Category:Chinese films

1950

1951

1952

1953

1954

1955

1956

1957

1958

1959

Mainland Chinese Film Production Totals

See also

Cinema of China
Best 100 Chinese Motion Pictures as chosen by the 24th Hong Kong Film Awards

References

Additional sources 
中国影片大典 Encyclopaedia of Chinese Films. 1949.10-1976, 故事片·戏曲片. (2001). Zhong guo ying pian da dian: 1949.10-1976. Beijing: 中国电影出版社 China Movie Publishing House. 
中国影片大典 Encyclopaedia of Chinese Films. 1931–1949.9, 故事片·戏曲片. (2005). Zhong guo ying pian da dian: 1931–1949.9. Beijing: 中国电影出版社 China Movie Publishing House.

External links
IMDb list of Chinese films

1950s
Films
Chinese